The Leach trench catapult (sometimes called a Leach-Gamage catapult) was a bomb-throwing catapult used by the British Army on the Western Front during World War I. It was designed to throw a  projectile in a high trajectory into enemy trenches. Although called a catapult, it was effectively a combination crossbow and slingshot.

The design was a Y-shaped frame with natural rubber bands pulled taut by a windlass and held in position by a hook release. They were manufactured by the Gamages department store in Central London and cost £6 17s 6d to make. In tests, the Leach catapult could propel a golf ball , and a cricket ball or Mills bomb .

The first was produced in March 1915 and by October of that year over 150 had been made. Twenty were allocated to each division. From the end of 1915 they were replaced by the French-made Sauterelle grenade launcher, and, in 1916, by the 2-inch medium trench mortar and Stokes mortar.

Copies of the Leach catapult, made locally by the Royal Engineers, were used in the Gallipoli Campaign.

References

Projectile weapons
World War I British infantry weapons
Grenade launchers